The Henry C. Hall House is a historic house at 107 Crescent Street in Waltham, Massachusetts.  This -story wood-frame house was built c. 1872–74 by Henry Hall, co-owner of a local pharmacy.  The house has a mansard roof characteristic of the Second Empire style, with a -story tower topped by a truncated hip roof.  The cornice of the tower and of the main house are both studded with brackets, as are the skirted roof lines above the building's projecting bays.

The house was listed on the National Register of Historic Places in 1989.

See also
National Register of Historic Places listings in Waltham, Massachusetts

References

Houses in Waltham, Massachusetts
Houses on the National Register of Historic Places in Waltham, Massachusetts
Italianate architecture in Massachusetts
Houses completed in 1872
National Register of Historic Places in Middlesex County, Massachusetts